The coat of arms of Malaysia is a coat of arms comprising a shield or escutcheon, two tigers for supporters, a crescent and fourteen-pointed star for a crest and a motto. As the Malaysian coat of arms descended from that of the Federated Malay States under British colonial rule, it resembles European heraldic designs.

Design 

The coat of arms consists of a shield guarded by two rampant tigers as supporters. The shield is topped by a crest consisting of a yellow crescent with a 14-pointed "federal star", and includes a motto, on a banner, at the bottom.

Crest or helm 
The yellow colour of the crest, a crescent and a 14-pointed federal star, symbolises the country's monarchy. The crescent also represents Islam as the official religion while the federal star represents the thirteen states and the Federal Territories of Malaysia.

Originally, the fourteen-pointed star represented the original fourteen states of Malaysia, which included Singapore. It was not changed when Singapore left the Federation in 1965, but it has generally been accepted that the 14th point represents the Federal Territories.

Escutcheon 
The escutcheon, represented by a shield, is primarily intended to serve as a representation of states unified under the Malaysian federation, and is subdivided into ten divisions.

The upper portion or chief of the shield contains five krises on a red background, representing the five former Unfederated Malay States, Johore, Terengganu, Kelantan, Kedah and Perlis. The remainder of the shield, which in the coat of arms of Malaya was divided in three per pale (longitudinally) between the former Federated Malay States, Penang and Malacca, is now divided into four sections:
 In the dexter (left from the observer's point of view) section is the Pinang palm along with the Penang Bridge representing Penang
 In the upper middle of the shield, below the row of krises, are the colours of the Federated Malay States (red, black, white and yellow) arranged from left to right. The permutations of the colours red, black, white and yellow make up the colours of these states' flags. Red, black and yellow are for Negeri Sembilan; black and white for Pahang; black, white and yellow for Perak; and red and yellow for Selangor.
 In the lower middle of the shield, there are three sections formerly representing the new (in 1963) states of Sabah, Singapore and Sarawak. Since 1965, Singapore's section has been replaced by a depiction of the national flower, the hibiscus.
 In the sinister (right from the observer's point of view) section is the "Malacca" tree representing the state of Malacca.

Supporters 
The two rampant tigers supporting the shield are traditional Malay symbols. They are retained from the earlier armorial ensign of the Federation of Malaya, and prior to that of the Federated Malay States. They symbolise strength and courage.

Motto 
The motto of the arms, located below the shield, consists of a banner with the phrase "Unity is Strength" (Bersekutu Bertambah Mutu) written in both romanised Malay and Jawi. The original English phrase was replaced by romanised Malay in 1963.

History

Federated Malay States and Malayan Union 

The origins of the Malaysian coat of arms can be traced to the formation of the Federated Malay States (FMS) under the colonial rule of the United Kingdom. In conjunction with the introduction of the flag of the Federated Malay States in 1895, the FMS coat of arms was adopted and remained in use from 1895 to the formation of the Federation of Malaya in 1948.

The arms, like its modern successors, included a shield, two tigers, and a banner, but depicts an eastern crown on the helm, representing the four sultanates. The shield's design was also significantly simpler; as the FMS consists of only four states, the shield encompassed a quarterly "party per cross" division representing the colours of the flag of the four FMS (in the same way the flag of the FMS represents the states, and the colours in the modern Malaysian arms represent the same states). The motto was also originally written in Jawi as "Dipelihara Allah" (Under God's (Allah's) Protection) flanked by two eight-pointed stars. Dipelihara Allah is today the Selangor state motto.

While the establishment of the Malayan Union in 1946 brought about the merging of the FMS with the five Unfederated Malay States and two of the Straits Settlements (excluding Singapore), the FMS arms remained in use unchanged as the Union's coat of arms for two years before the Union's dissolution.

Federation of Malaya 

The founding of the Federation of Malaya in 1948 led to a revision of the arms. Among the changes were a more complete representation the 11 states of the federation on the shield (where new partitions containing insignias of the additional states added over and beside the original FMS colours), the replacement of the eastern crown with a yellow crescent and an 11-pointed federal star (symbols representing the 11 states that were derived from the flag of the Federation of Malaya). The original Jawi motto was also replaced with "Unity is Strength" in both English and Jawi Malay.

At the point of adoption, the shield was composed of the following elements:
 In chief, the five krises representing the Unfederated Malay States;
 In pale, the quartered colours of the FMS;
 In dexter, the Prince of Wales's feathers, crenellation, and waves from the Penang coat of arms; and
 In sinister, and gate of A Famosa from the Malaccan coat of arms.

Malaysia 

The arms was amended a second time after the formation of Malaysia, with the admission of Singapore and the Borneo states of North Borneo (Sabah) and Sarawak in 1963. The increased number of states later resulted in the modification of the Federation of Malaya coat of arms to support the three new member states with the widening of the shield. The tigers were redesigned to assume different positions of limbs (front limbs reaching over and behind the shield, and rear limbs reaching over the motto and the shield), and minor adjustments were also made on the appearance of the banner and the length of the crescent, while the 11-pointed federal star was updated to include 14 points. In tandem with Malay as Malaysia's national language, the English motto was replaced with Malay language.

During this period of revision, the Malacca's colonial A Famosa insignia was replaced by a Malacca tree. Some of the symbols was modified to eliminate the colonial symbols and other non-Islamic symbols. While other symbols was remained. Penang's Prince of Wales's feathers and crenellation were gradually replaced, by first substituting the feathers with a Pinang palm and, later, the crenellation with the Penang Bridge (which was constructed and completed during the 1980s). Following the expulsion of Singapore in 1965, the coat of arms was redesigned again. In 1988, Sarawak's symbol replaced by the current hornbill-based state arms; similarly, Sabah, which was originally represented by only its flag held up by a pair of arms from its pre-1963 state coat of arms, was revised to fully feature its current state arms in entirely. The Malaysia's version of coat of arms later resulted in a more realistic and aggressive appearance of tigers.

Uses 
The arms is adopted on several state flags. The Royal Standard of the Yang di-Pertuan Agong, the flag of the Federal Territories and the flag of Putrajaya all feature the arms charged in the centre largely unmodified.

See also

 Armorial of Malaysia

References

External links

 
Malaysia
National symbols of Malaysia
Coats of arms with tigers
Malaysia